Inside Nature's Giants is a British science documentary, first broadcast in June 2009 by Channel 4. The documentary shows experts performing dissection on some of nature's largest animals, including whales and elephants.

The programme is presented by Mark Evans. The series attempts to uncover the secrets of the animals examined. Mark is assisted by evolutionary biologists Richard Dawkins and Simon Watt, and comparative anatomist Joy Reidenberg. In 2012, it aired on PBS in the United States, and repeats occasionally air on Eden and Watch in the UK.

Episodes

Series 1 (2009)

Note: The season received the 2010 BAFTA Television Award for Best Specialist Factual.

Series 2 (2010)

Series 3 (2011)

Series 4 (2012)

References

External links
 
 Inside Nature's Giants at Channel 4
 Inside Nature's Giants at National Geographic Channel
 Inside Nature's Giants on PBS

Channel 4 original programming
BAFTA winners (television series)
2009 British television series debuts
2012 British television series endings
2000s British documentary television series
2010s British documentary television series
Television series by All3Media
Television series by ITV Studios
English-language television shows